The 2012–13 Borussia Dortmund II season is their first professional season since promotion last season.

Review and events
The 2012–13 Borussia Dortmund II season began on 21 July 2012 with a loss against VfL Osnabrück. It was scheduled to end against VfB Stuttgart II on 18 May 2013.

Match results

Legend

3. Liga

League results and fixtures

Table

League table

Summary table

Squad and statistics

References

Match reports

Other sources

2012-13 2
Borussia Dortmund 2